Neoploca is a genus of moths belonging to the subfamily Thyatirinae of the Drepanidae. It was first described by Shōnen Matsumura in 1927. It contains only one species, Neoploca arctipennis, first described by Arthur Gardiner Butler in 1878, which is found in Japan, Korea, the Russian Far East and China (Jilin, Inner Mongolia, Shaanxi, Jiangsu).

The wingspan is 35–38 mm. The forewings are silvery grey, the base, a central irregular black edged band, a transverse discal stripe and the outer border are rather paler and greyer than the rest of the wing. There is a black dot at the interior angle of the cell, a disco-submarginal series, a series of marginal black lunules and a short oblique black apical line. The hindwings are shining sordid white, with a broad, pale brown external border.

The larvae feed on Quercus mongolica.

References 

 , 1878, Annals and Magazine of Natural History 1: 198
 , 2007, Esperiana Buchreihe zur Entomologie Band 13: 1-683 

Thyatirinae
Monotypic moth genera
Moths of Asia
Drepanidae genera